Keith Andrews may refer to:
Keith Andrews (art historian) (1920–1989), British art historian
Keith Andrews (racing driver) (1920–1957), American racecar driver
Keith Andrews (bishop) (born 1954), American Anglican bishop
Keith Andrews (rugby union) (born 1962), South African rugby union player
Keith Andrews (footballer) (born 1980), Irish footballer

See also

Keith Andrew (1929–2010), English cricketer
Andrew Keith (disambiguation)

Andrews (disambiguation)
Keith (disambiguation)